Evermannia is a genus of gobies native to the eastern central Pacific Ocean coast of the Americas from Baja California to Panama. The genus name honours the American ichthyologist Barton Warren Evermann (1853–1932).

Species
There are currently four recognized species in this genus:
 Evermannia erici W. A. Bussing, 1983
 Evermannia longipinnis (Steindachner, 1879) (Enigmatic goby)
 Evermannia panamensis C. H. Gilbert & Starks, 1904
 Evermannia zosterura (D. S. Jordan & C. H. Gilbert, 1882) (Bandedtail goby)

References

Gobiidae
Taxa named by David Starr Jordan